The 32nd PMPC Star Awards for Movies, was an accolade to give and honor the Filipino mainstream and independent films, personalities and movie industry stakeholders in the year 2015, organized by the Philippine Movie Press Club, headed by current president Fernan "Miss F" de Guzman (also a radio anchor of Radyo Inquirer) and produced by Airtime Marketing Philippines headed by Tessie Celestino-Howard. The awards night was held on March 6, 2016 at the Newport Performing Arts Theater, Resorts World Manila, Pasay and aired on ABS-CBN's Sunday Best on March 13, 2016.

The awards night was hosted by Piolo Pascual, Kim Chiu, Xian Lim, Alex Gonzaga, Bela Padilla and Robi Domingo with opening performance by Jed Madela, Yeng Constantino, Christian Bautista, Morissette Amon, Mark Bautista and Juris Fernandez commemorating the love teams and love themes of Philippine cinema. Another performance was done by #Hashtags, an all-boy dance group of noontime show It's Showtime.

One of the highlights of the event is the memoriam tribute of the PMPC to the "Master Showman" German Moreno and film directors Uro dela Cruz, Wenn V. Deramas and Francis Pasion who died on the first quarter of 2016.

The Philippine Movie Press Club currently celebrating their 50th Golden Anniversary this 2016.

Winners and Nominees
These are the nominations list (in alphabetical order) for the awarding ceremony. (period of nomination: Films that have been shown from January to December 2016)

Winners are listed first and highlighted with boldface.

Major categories

Technical categories

Special awards

 Nora Aunor Ulirang Artista Lifetime Achievement Award - Amalia Fuentes
 Ulirang Alagad ng Pelikula sa Likod ng Kamera Lifetime Achievement Award - Mel Chionglo
 Posthumous Award for Entertainment Excellence - German Moreno, accepted by his nephew, John Nite
 Male Face of the Night - John Arcilla
 Female Face of the Night - Bela Padilla

Rundown
Note: Except special awards.

Mainstream

Indie

See also
List of Philippine films of 2015

References

PMPC
PMPC
Philippine film awards